Terry Klassen is a Canadian voice actor, ADR director and writer. Before animation, Klassen worked in radio in Winnipeg (CITI-FM), Toronto (Q107), Calgary (CFAC), Portage la Prairie (CFRY) and part-time at CFOX and CFMI. In animation, he is best known for his work on My Little Pony being voice director of all episodes including the movie (Canadian talent) and the Equestria Girls series. Klassen has also voiced many characters including Baby Sylvester in Baby Looney Tunes, Tusky Husky in Krypto the Superdog and Tony and Seth Parsons in The Cramp Twins.

Career
Klassen co-created Yvon of the Yukon. He is the voice director for shows and films including Martha Speaks, Johnny Test, Max Steel, George of the Jungle, Ed, Edd n Eddy, several Barbie movies, Transformers, Cardcaptors, Salty's Lighthouse, G.I. Joe, Pucca, My Little Pony: Friendship is Magic, Littlest Pet Shop, and many more series. Klassen is also a writer and owned a production company with Ian James Corlett which helped with localizations, and also he was a story editor on the Bakugan series. He was nominated for a Daytime Emmy Award for Outstanding Directing in an Animated Program for Martha Speaks. Klassen was also a co-voice director on the 3D animated series Pac-Man (NerdCorp/Mattel). Klassen continues to work as a voice director on series such as Johnny Test, Polly Pocket, several different Marvel Webisodes series and also the voice of 'Gramps' on the Netflix series StarBeam.

Filmography

Anime
 Ayakashi: Samurai Horror Tales - Kohei Kobotoke
 Death Note - Coadjuvant Shinigami
 Dragon Ball Z - Krillin, Master Roshi (ep. 108+), Babidi, Guldo, King Vegeta, West Kai, Additional Voices (Ocean Group dub)
 Escaflowne - Mole Man (Ocean Group dub)
 Galaxy Express 999 - The Conductor
 Hamtaro - Jingle
 Inuyasha - Hachi, Kotatsu the Hell Painter
 Key the Metal Idol - Senichi Tamari
 Maison Ikkoku - Sakamoto
 Master Keaton - Colonel Foster
 Mega Man: Upon a Star - Rush
 MegaMan NT Warrior - JunkDataMan
 Mobile Suit Gundam - Quaran, Fed Messenger
 Monkey Magic - Wowzer, Lao Tzu, Minister Fuchin, Sonicmate
 Monster Rancher - Most, Captain Evil Hare, Ed, Ducken, Color Pandora, Jill, Additional Voices
 Powerpuff Girls Z - Mr. Looper (Fruit Shop Merchant)
 Ranma ½ - Hiroshi, Chingensai, various others
 Saber Marionette J - Pinsuke, Additional Voices
 The SoulTaker - Henry
 Transformers: Armada - High Wire, Shaun's Father
 Transformers: Cybertron - Brimstone, Tim Hansen, Stanton
 Transformers: Energon - Skyblast, Six Shot
 The Vision of Escaflowne - Mole Man, Pyle, Teo, Additional Voices (Ocean Group dub)
 Zoids - Billy, Dispatch, Fence
 Zoids Fuzors - Billy, Dispatch, Fence
  Yashahime: Princess Half-Demon - Hachi

Animation
 Animated Classic Showcase - Several Characters
 The Baby Huey Show - Additional Voices
 Baby Looney Tunes - Baby Sylvester, Baby Pepé
 Baby Looney Tunes' Eggs-traordinary Adventure - Baby Sylvester
 Barbie and the Three Musketeers - Pig, Regent Guard #1, Henchman
 Barbie as Rapunzel - Fat Swordsman / Baker
 Barbie as the Island Princess - Butler, Guard, Horse
 Barbie in a Christmas Carol - Hypnotist / Boz
 Barbie: Mariposa and the Fairy Princess - Skeezite #1
 Beat Bugs - Farmer
 Being Ian - Wally / Nite Show Host / Ian's Report Voiceover / Elderly Tennis Player / Unibrowed Police Officer / Dr. Schmertz / Lonely Ranger
 Billy the Cat - Moonie
 Bob's Broken Sleigh - Puffin Minion 2
 The Bots Master - D'Nerd
 The Brothers Grunt - Additional Voices
 Bucky O'Hare and the Toad Wars - Frix
 The Cramp Twins - Tony Parsons / Seth Parsons
 Camp Candy - Additional Voices
 Casper's Haunted Christmas - Stinkie
 A Christmas Adventure ...From a Book Called Wisely's Tales - Snow Mobile Rider #2, Bear
 Class of the Titans - Eros / Polyphemus
 Coconut Fred's Fruit Salad Island - Teddy the Bat
 Cybersix - Von Reichter
 Dragon Tales - The Fury
 D'Myna Leagues - Abe the Ump, Old Gordo, Bicycle Bob, Flatt, Steve Mungo
 Ed, Edd n Eddy's Big Picture Show - Eddy's brother
 Extreme Dinosaurs - Spittor, Argor
 Exosquad Fantastic Four: World's Greatest Heroes - Impossible Man
 Fat Dog Mendoza - Texas Harry Longhorn, Precious, Monkey Selling Cookies, Company Employee 1, Swarmy Reporter, Pilot, Ambulance Medic, Mr. Omnipotent, Betting Spaniard, Lenny the Ham Man, Young Nerd
 Firehouse Tales - Additional Voices
 Gadget and the Gadgetinis - Additional Voices
 G.I. Joe: A Real American Hero - Topside
 G.I. Joe Extreme - Kang Chi 'Black Dragon' Lee (Season 2)
 Happy, the Littlest Bunny - Unknown
 Johnny Test - Additional Voices
 Jungle Book - Kaa
 Kid vs. Kat - Additional Voices
 Krypto the Superdog - Waddles the Penguin, Tusky Husky, various
 Lapitch the Little Shoemaker - Dirty Rat
 LeapFrog - Additional Voices
 Littlest Pet Shop (1995) - Additional Voices
 Littlest Pet Shop (2012) - TV Studio tour guide, Princess Stori, Dr. Mooser, Passerby Chihuahua, Dr. Handsomeface 
 LoliRock - Stanley 
 Martha Speaks - O.G. Kennelly, various characters
 Mega Man - Cut Man, Ice Man, Bomb Man, Elec Man, Hard Man, Shadow Man, Toad Man

 Mummies Alive! - Mr. Huxley / Additional Voices
 My Little Pony: Friendship is Magic - Young Hoops, Pinkie Pie's father, Carriage Stallions, Apple Split
 My Little Pony: Rainbow Roadtrip - Moody Root, Trout pony
 My Scene Goes Hollywood: The Movie - Jim
 NASCAR Racers - Additional Voices
 Pocket Dragon Adventures - Cuddles
 PollyWorld - Tech Guy
 The Puzzle Club Christmas Mystery RoboCop: Alpha Commando - Additional Voices
 The Ripping Friends - Pooperman
 Rudolph the Red-Nosed Reindeer: The Movie - Dancer
 Roary the Racing Car - Additional Voices
 Sabrina: The Animated Series - Additional Voices
 Santa's Christmas Snooze Sherlock Holmes in the 22nd Century - Additional Voices
 SheZow - Fuji Kido
 Skysurfer Strike Force - Zachariah Easel, Adam Hollister
 Sleeping Beauty - Misc
 Space Strikers - Malcolm
 StarBeam - Gramps
 Stone Protectors The Story of Christmas Street Sharks - Additional Voices
 Stories From My Childhood - Various Characters
 Timothy Tweedle the First Christmas Elf - Boo, Clyde
 The Wacky World of Tex Avery - Maurice
 What About Mimi? - Additional Voices
 Video Power - Additional Voices
 Voltron Force - Kloak
 Yakkity Yak - Gary
 Yvon of the Yukon - Hockey Dad, French Man, King Louis Actor, Dil, Private Fuji, Sweaty Guy, Guard, German Tourist, Beamish, The Duke, Guy Donnyette

Writer
 Bakugan Battle Brawlers Billy the Cat Beyblade 
 Cybersix Dragon Ball Dragon Ball Z Transformers Armada Weird-Oh'sCasting director
 A Christmas Adventure... From a Book Called Wisely's Tales Fat Dog Mendoza Ghost Patrol Mama, Do You Love? Pocket Dragon Adventures Popeye's Voyage: The Quest for Pappy Project A-ko 2: Plot of the Daitokuji Financial Group Project A-ko 3: Cinderella Rhapsody Project A-Ko 4: Final Ranma ½ Rekkit Rabbit Salty's Lighthouse Scary Godmother: The Revenge of JimmyVoice director
 Fat Dog Mendoza G.I. Joe: Valor vs. Venom Ed, Edd n Eddy Firehouse Tales Pucca Milo's Bug Quest My Little Pony: Friendship is Magic Class of the Titans George of the Jungle Johnny Test Mega Man Littlest Pet Shop (2012)
 Kid vs Kat Martha Speaks Little Witch Cardcaptors Salty's Lighthouse Inhumans Jibber Jabber Pirate Express Zigby Yakkity Yak A Christmas Adventure... From a Book Called Wisely's Tales Mama, Do You Love Me? Scary Godmother: The Revenge of Jimmy Popeye's Voyage: The Quest for Pappy Voltron Force Zoids: Fuzors Santa Mouse and the Ratdeer Astonishing X-Men Pocket Dragon Adventures Nerds and Monsters Transformers Armada Transformers Cybertron Transformers Energon Max Steel vs. The Mutant Menace Ricky Sprocket, Showbiz Boy LoliRock D'Myna Leagues Polly and the Pockets Mosaic What About Mimi? Stories From My Childhood Krypto the Superdog Peanuts Webisodes The Barbie film trilogy (starting with Barbie: Fairytopia)
 Being Ian Yvon of the Yukon Mega Babies Eternals Astonishing X-Men Peanuts Motion Comics Mega Man: Upon a Star Ed, Edd n Eddy's Big Picture Show Aaagh! It's the Mr. Hell Show! Rainbow Fish Packages from Planet X Pac-Man and the Ghostly Adventures Shelldon Maya the Bee SheZow Rekkit Rabbit Kelly's Dream Club Adventures of Mowgli Wolverine: Weapon X Wolverine vs. Sabretooth Wolverine: Origin Ultimate Wolverine vs. Hulk Inhumans Sausage Party Hot Wheels Battle Force 5 Dragons: Fire and Ice Max Steel Finley the Fire Engine Ghost Patrol Supernoobs The Nutty Professor PollyWorld HulkMiscellaneous crew
 A-Ko The Versus - Dialogue Director
 Bakugan Battle Brawlers - Story Editor
 Billy the Cat - Dubbing Director
 Dragon Ball Z - Producer (Ocean Dub)
 Halloween: Resurgence - Boom Operator, Production Assistant
 The Magic Backpack - Production Assistant
 Max Steel Turbo Team: Fusion Tek - Recording Director
 Mega Man - Dialogue Director
 Mermaid's Scar - Dialogue Director
 One Big Hapa Family - Voice Dialogue Director
 Project A-ko 2: Plot of the Daitokuji Financial Group - Dialogue Director
 Project A-ko 3: Cinderella Rhapsody - Dialogue Director
 Project A-Ko 4: Final - Dialogue Director
 Ranma ½ - Translator, Dialogue Director
 Skysurfer Strike Force - Dialogue Editor
 Yvon of the Yukon'' - Co-Creator, Associate Producer

References

External links

Living people
Canadian casting directors
Canadian impressionists (entertainers)
Canadian male television writers
Canadian male voice actors
Canadian male screenwriters
Place of birth missing (living people)
Canadian television writers
Canadian television producers
Canadian translators
Canadian voice directors
Year of birth missing (living people)
20th-century Canadian male writers
20th-century Canadian screenwriters
21st-century Canadian male writers
21st-century Canadian screenwriters